John Milan Ashbrook (September 21, 1928 – April 24, 1982) was an American politician and newspaper publisher. A member of the Republican Party, he  served in the United States House of Representatives from Ohio from 1961 until his death. Ashbrook was associated with the New Right, and he ran against President Richard Nixon in the 1972 Republican Party presidential primaries, attempting to appeal to voters who believed Nixon was insufficiently conservative, but he failed to win any statewide contests. At the time of his death, he was running for U.S. Senate in Ohio in the 1982 election.

Early life
John Milan Ashbrook was born on September 21, 1928, in Johnstown, Ohio to William A. Ashbrook, a newspaper editor, businessman, and U.S. representative, and Marie Swank. Ashbrook graduated from Harvard University in 1952 and later from Ohio State University's law school in 1955. In 1953, Ashbrook became the publisher of his father's newspaper, the Johnstown Independent. On July 3, 1948, he married Joan Needles and later had three children with her before they divorced in 1971. In 1974, he remarried to Jean Spencer.

Career

He was elected to the Ohio House of Representatives in 1956, and served two terms. In 1960, the seat that his father had once held in the House of Representatives was vacated and Ashbrook ran for and won it.

1964 presidential election

With William Rusher and F. Clifton White, associates from the Young Republicans in the 1950s, Ashbrook was involved in the start-up of the Draft Goldwater Committee in 1961.

In 1966, journalist Drew Pearson reported that Ashbrook was one of a group of Congressman who had received the "Statesman of the Republic" award from Liberty Lobby for his "right-wing activities".

1972 presidential election

Despite having supported Richard Nixon during the 1968 presidential election Ashbrook turned against him during his presidency. On December 29, 1971 he announced that he would oppose Nixon in the Republican primaries as an alternative conservative candidate and received support from conservative figures like William F. Buckley Jr. His slogan "No Left Turns" was illustrated by a mock traffic symbol of a left-turn arrow with a superimposed No symbol. It was meant to symbolize the frustration of some conservatives with Nixon, whom they saw as having abandoned conservative principles and "turned left" on issues such as budget deficits, affirmative action, the creation of the Environmental Protection Agency, wage and price controls, and most of all, improving relations with the Soviet Union and the People's Republic of China with his policy of détente.

Ashbrook competed in the New Hampshire (9.8% of the vote), Florida (9%), and California (10%) primaries. He withdrew from the race after the California primary and "with great reluctance" supported Nixon. His campaign, although of minimal immediate impact, is remembered fondly by conservatives who admire Ashbrook for having stood for their principles. Ashbrook said in criticism of the Nixon administration,"I still believe it in the best American tradition to speak out even when it is in criticism of your party's actions."

When Nixon became mired in the Watergate scandal, Ashbrook became the first House Republican to call for the President's resignation.

Death and legacy
In 1982, Ashbrook announced his intention to seek the Republican nomination to challenge incumbent Democratic Senator Howard Metzenbaum and polls showed him winning the primary with a plurality. However, on April 24, 1982, he suffered a gastric hemorrhage at the offices of The Johnstown Independent, and died at Licking Memorial Hospital in Newark, Ohio, aged 53. President Ronald Reagan memorialized him, saying: "John Ashbrook was a man of courage and principle. He served his constituents and his country with dedication and devotion, always working towards the betterment of his fellow man. His patriotism and deep belief in the greatness of America never wavered and his articulate and passionate calls for a return to old-fashioned American values earned him the respect of all who knew him."

Ashbrook's widow, Jean Spencer Ashbrook, was chosen in a special election to serve the remaining seven months of his congressional term.

The Ashbrook Center for Public Affairs at Ashland University was named for Ashbrook in 1983. A periodic John M. Ashbrook Memorial Dinner at the center features leading conservative speakers from President Ronald Reagan (first dinner; dedication of the Center, in 1983) and Margaret Thatcher (1993) to Mitt Romney (April 2010) and John Boehner (June 2011).

Electoral history

See also
 List of United States Congress members who died in office (1950–99)
 List of United States representatives from Ohio
 List of members of the House Un-American Activities Committee

References

External links

 Biography at the Ashbrook Center for Public Affairs at Ashland University
 John M. Ashbrook's 1972 Announcement for the Presidency
 

1928 births
1982 deaths
20th-century American newspaper publishers (people)
20th-century American politicians
Candidates in the 1972 United States presidential election
Candidates in the 1982 United States elections
Deaths from ulcers
Harvard College alumni
Republican Party members of the Ohio House of Representatives
New Right (United States)
Ohio State University Moritz College of Law alumni
People from Licking County, Ohio
Republican Party members of the United States House of Representatives from Ohio